Falling Away may refer to:

 Backsliding, in Christianity 
 Falling Away (album), a 2006 album from Crossfade and the title track
 "Falling Away" (Jupiter Rising song)
 "Falling Away" (Marion Raven song)